The United Tasmania Group (UTG) is generally acknowledged as the world's first Green party to contest elections. The party was formed on 23 March 1972, during a meeting of the Lake Pedder Action Committee (LPAC) at the Hobart Town Hall in order to field political candidates in the April 1972 state election.

1970s
UTG contested ten state and federal elections between 1972 and 1977, with the highest vote of 9.9% in the Legislative Council election with Rod Broadby in 1975 (see Appendix 4, UTG Journal Issue No. 6, 2021).

The United Tasmania Group's first President was Dr Richard Jones and it lasted for five years, briefly reforming in 1990 for the federal election. A few of the 1970s candidates, including Bob Brown, went on to form the Tasmanian Greens and then ultimately, at the national level, the Australian Greens.

2010s
On 2 April 2016 following a meeting, former members of the party re-started the group.

The United Tasmania Group launched The UTG Journal in 2018. The journal is designed to cover a wide range of topics, including the development of conservation and other issues since that original founding date in April, 1972. Six issues of The UTG Journal have been published since the re-start of the organisation in 2016.

Histories and analysis
In the mid 1990s Lance Armstrong wrote a history of the politics of Tasmania in the 1990s.
 
In the mid-2000s author Bill Lines also attempted to grapple with the broader scope of politics in Australia relative to greens politics in Patriots.
In the late 2010s Paddy Manning researched and wrote a history of the Greens in Australia, and included the UTG in the first chapter, acknowledging the importance of the group within the larger context.

An unpublished Honours Thesis on the party by Pam Walker (University of Tasmania) was written in 1986, and the first chapter in Paddy Manning's book, Inside the Greens (2019), is devoted to the history of the party.

Publications

1970s

2000s
 The UTG Journal issue No. 1
 The UTG Journal Issue No. 2
 The UTG Journal Issue No. 3
 The UTG Journal Issue No. 4
 The UTG Journal Issue No. 5
 The UNITED TASMANIA GROUP Story Policy Compilation The UTG Journal Issue No. 6 Special 50th year edition
 The UTG Journal Issue No. 7
 The UTG Journal Issue No. 8

See also
 List of political parties in Australia

 Living Soil Association of Tasmania

References

External links
 History of Green Politics in Tasmania
 The UTG 'New Ethic' Charter

 
Tasmania
Political parties established in 1972
1972 establishments in Australia